The 1993 European Youth Summer Olympic Days was the second edition of multi-sport event for European youths between the ages of 12 and 18. It was held in Valkenswaard, Netherlands from 3 to 9 July.

Sports

A total of ten sports were contested by 1874 athletes representing 43 European nations. Table tennis was dropped from the 1991 program, while cycling and gymnastics made their first appearance.

Medal table

References

Bell, Daniel (2003). Encyclopedia of International Games. McFarland and Company, Inc. Publishers, Jefferson, North Carolina. .
Medal table
Tableau des médailles Valkenswaard - Pays Bas (1993). French Olympic Committee. Retrieved on 2014-11-23.

 
1993
European Youth Summer Olympic Days
European Youth Summer Olympic Days
European Youth Summer Olympic Days
Multi-sport events in the Netherlands
Youth sport in the Netherlands
July 1993 sports events in Europe
European Youth Summer Olympic Festival 1993
Sport in Valkenswaard
Sports competitions in North Brabant